Tetratheca efoliata is a species of flowering plant in the quandong family that is endemic to Australia.

Description
The species grows as a tangled leafless shrub to 10–40 cm in height. The flowers are pink-purple or white, appearing from July to December.

Distribution and habitat
The range of the species lies within the Avon Wheatbelt, Coolgardie, Esperance Plains and Mallee IBRA bioregions of south-west Western Australia. The plants grow on sandplains on yellow sand and lateritic soils.

References

efoliata
Eudicots of Western Australia
Oxalidales of Australia
Taxa named by Ferdinand von Mueller
Plants described in 1876